, also known as "lute priests", were travelling performers in the era of Japanese history preceding the Meiji period. They earned their income by reciting vocal literature to the accompaniment of  music.  were mostly blind, and adopted the shaved heads and robes common to Buddhist monks. The occupation likely had its origin in China and India, where blind Buddhist lay-priest performers were once common.

Although these performers existed well before the events of the Genpei War, they eventually became famous for narrating tales about this war. Before  sang , they were entertainers and ritual performers.

The  are considered the first performers of the Tale of the Heike, which is one of Japan's most famous epics. It details battles between two powerful clans, the Minamoto and the Taira around the 12th century. The Taira (or Heike) were eventually annihilated by the Minamoto (sometimes called the Genji), who systematically killed every male descendant of the Taira. Religion in Japan at the time incorporated many native animistic (Shinto) beliefs into its Buddhist theological framework, leading many court nobles and religious leaders to worry about angry Taira spirits disrupting the peace. The great earthquake around 1185 CE contributed to this sentiment. Since their rituals included placating spirits and preventing plagues,  music became a vehicle for placating lingering, resentful Heike spirits.  and  became immensely popular for the next several hundred years.

Etymology

 are referred to in Japanese iconography that dates back to the late Heian period (794–1185 CE).

History

Origins and proliferation
These were the Ichikata school, founded by Akashi Kyoichi, and the Yasaka School, founded by Yasaka Kigen.

The proliferation of the Yasaka and Ichikata factions heightened with the contributions of Akashi Kakuichi (1300–1371). A documented reason for this is that Kakuichi was largely responsible for forming the Ichikata guild. To be accepted as a disciple, an aspiring student would have to pay a fee, after which the study of each new piece of music required payment.

By the 13th and 14th centuries,  performed for the military elite and the aristocracy, including the regional  feudal lords. Public performances were also given during Buddhist temple services. The general population had the further option of attending Kanjin performances, which they were required to pay a fee to see.

Sengoku to Edo period
The war instigated the Sengoku period (15th–17th centuries), an era of civil war and political–military conflict that lasted for nearly two centuries.

During the Edo period (1600–1868), the Tokugawa shogunate provided the Tōdō with special privileges and substantial financing, which the Tōdō then distributed to members according to rank. The Edo period also marks the era in which the shogunate designated  as one of its official ceremonial forms of music. Accordingly, new schools of  appeared, many of which were influenced by the newly-introduced  and its accompanying styles of music. The two predominant schools that came about during the Edo period were the Maeda-ryū founded by Maeda Kyūichi, and the Hatano-ryū founded by Hatano Kōichi. Both figures were members of the Shidō-ha, which was the most active branch of the older Ichikata school.

Collaborations were formed between amateur aficionados of the  who, over the course of the Edo period, made small revisions to the musical notation of the  score. The ceremonial form of the  performed for the shogunate became increasingly solemn and refined to meet the standards of the intellectual class. Moreover, to ensure the development of the  score, improvisation notably declined.

Meiji period to present
In 1868, the Meiji Restoration heralded the collapse of the Tokugawa shogunate. This ultimately contributed to the abolition of the Tōdō, which undermined social privileges for the musicians and reduced the availability of avenues for performance. The Hatano-ryū, in particular, underwent a debilitating decline in popularity, so much so that it struggled to survive in Kyoto until the middle of the 20th century.

The  tradition persisted, however, through the Tsugaru lineage (transmitted by sighted performers) and the Nagoya lineage (transmitted by professional blind musicians of the Tōdō tradition), both of which belonged to the Maeda-ryū. Differences exist between these lineages due to geographical separation and changes that have occurred uniquely in time. For example, the Nagoya lineage relied almost entirely on oral transmission. Nevertheless, the Nagoya  and Tsugaru  were both nominated by the Japanese government as "Intangible Cultural Properties" in 1955 and 1959 respectively, with Nagoya performers Inokawa Kōji, Doizaki Masatomi and Mishina Masayasu nominated as national treasures.

The libretto notation on which remaining  performance is based today in Nagoya is called Heike Shosetsu.

Recognising that traditional Japanese music, and interest in it, was quickly falling out of fashion, Takemitsu, as well as a number of composers before him, noted that studies in music theory and music composition almost entirely consisted of Western theory and instruction. Takemitsu, on the other hand, collaborated with Western composers and compositions to include the distinctly Asian-sounding .

According to Hugh de Ferranti, modern, live performances of  narrative singing are rare, with almost all performers being "practitioners of Chikuzen-biwa and Satsuma-biwa". The  "emerged from interaction between moso and the samurai class" in Satsuma Province, starting a period of popularity for "modern " until the 1930s, while the  had its origin in the 1890s in the Chikuzen region of Kyushu, drawing upon aspects of  music, and the  technique. These traditions enjoyed widespread appreciation during the early 20th century due to the "mationalist, militarist sentiments of late-Meiji imperialist ideology". In the post-war era, these traditions were considered "refined classical pursuits", resulting in their popularity beyond . The  itself is also depicted with the image of goddess Benzaiten at her shrines, and in images of the  "in homes, shops, and offices".

As such, "most Japanese come to think of the biwa as a battered old string instrument played by a decrepit blind man who looks like a Buddhist priest and wanders about chanting old tales about war and ghosts". The instrument is viewed as antiquated, a relic of the past that "cannot be a thing of contemporary Japanese life and experience, but is tied forever to the world of the Tale of the Heike; a gloomy world of martial valour and samurai ghosts".

Blindness
For most of Japan's recorded history, music along with narrative performance have been frequent professions for the blind, whose importance in most other major genres is also unavoidable, save for court and theatre music, from the 13th century until the 19th.

According to De Ferranti, the act of playing lutes for alms by blind musicians finds its roots in Indian Buddhist culture during the 1st millennium CE. A 7th-century text from China and Japan's early 12th-century  recount this story, while other "scattered accounts" of blind lute-laying priests can be found in Tang-period volumes from the Chinese mainland. In the Shanbei region near Inner Mongolia, "blind beggars who recited tales and travelled with pipa accompanists were common", prior to the 1949 revolution. Under Mao Zedong, blind itinerants called   played a three-string lute in "household ritual contexts" using their narrative "as a potent force for social reform" by the Communist Party.

Prior to the spread of Buddhism during the 6th to 9th centuries, it was "generally acknowledged that in Japanese ritual life blind men and women [were] respected as shamanic celebrants who bore numinous power because of their separation from the world experienced by others". Historically, the blind performed healing rituals for curing illness and exorcising spirits. For music, plucking or striking string instruments also have ritual meanings, and were tasks probably given to blind individuals to perform in belief of their shamanistic abilities. The Azusa Yumi was utilized for summoning deities in a pre-Buddhist ritual, likely involving the blind. The role of early  in delivery the vocal performance of battle tales "to allay the fury of slain warriors' ghosts" further implies a shamanistic qualification of the blind. Historical references suggest  were involved in both divination and also in this fundamental role of placating aggravated spirits, especially those killed in battle.

Blindness was a necessary condition for membership in these organizations, which looked after blind  performers and professionals and blind  ritualists respectively. In the Tōdō,  performers came to control the guild, and thus the lives of many Japanese blind people. According to the legends of these institutions, "the lineage of blind  players ultimately is traced to ... a blind disciple of the historical Buddha Shakyamuni, called Gankutsu Sonja".

However, according to Hugh de Ferranti, not all blind  players of antiquity "were completely lacking the sense of vision and knowledge of music". Also, many blind individuals gain the ailment gradually, resulting from aging, illness, or accident, meaning literacy may have been acquired earlier in life. Hugh de Ferranti states that notable numbers of  performers "were sighted and in some cases literate", evidenced by records of the Jojuin  tradition and historical membership of the Gensei Hōryū  group. Such individuals thus must be acknowledged for potential importance in producing written texts and in the "transmission of repertory".

Religious significance
Buddhist iconography throughout East and South-East Asia depict short-necked lutes being played by celestial beings as well as the Hindu goddess Saraswati, who led such divine musicians.

Japanese iconography indicates two female lute-playing deities: the aforementioned Benzaiten and Myōonten; their identities are often fused together, but both have their roots in the continental Asian tradition, and can be traced from Sarasvati through various forms. Benzaiten represents eloquence while Myōonten epitomizes music itself. As the bodhisattva named "Miraculous Sound", Myōon Bōsatsu is described in the Lotus Sutra and was important for  players in court society. Her influence would spread beyond the court, integrating itself especially in the  tradition. After the early 8th century however, most sculptures and iconographic depictions show the pipa instead of the lute.

Locations whose name contain the characters or sounds  also have sanctified lore. Lake Biwa is famous for Chikubu-shima, where Taira no Tsunemasa performs at the Benzaiten shrine, whose deity appears in the form of a white dragon. Especially in Kyushu, there are  hills, valleys, ponds, and bridges throughout Japan, where performers supposedly buried or offered instruments to the local waters. Other legends of certain sects and accounts from ancient texts further the sacred associations of the  instrument.

Gender
However, it was common in Tang China for women to play the pipa, as it was also common for courtly women from the Heian through Muromachi periods to learn  in childhood. There are also a few rare references to both sighted and blind female entertainers who may have played , though in the Edo period, some female enthusiasts learned from  professionals as a recreational activity.

Itinerant women performers did still exist in medieval Japan, though they are most frequently shown playing the  drum. The former along with its wooden imitation,  were played for performance to procure alms, house to house; this was called . In Kyushu,  were not uncommon with such performers mentioned in the Tōdō's late-18th-century accounts. Although not bona fide members of the guild,  held annual festivals, and this profession continued to be viable into the mid-1900s.

Social status
Though blindness in Japanese society has historically been stigmatized "as the result of a Buddhist interpretation of the condition as a form of karmic punishment", other factors also led to the marginalization and discrimination of blind musicians. In general, the blind were treated according to the restrictions of their societal rank. In other words, commoner townsmen and warrior–rank blind people "were allowed to engage in the professions available to all of similar rank, within the constraints of their visual impairment", while those in agrarian households were expected to contribute to the payment of land taxes via any means of labor possible. However, the most common professions for all such peoples included music, massage, acupuncture and moxa therapy, while ritual work was common in specialized locations.

Door-to-door performances delivered by professionals associated to shrines and temples also occurred in the historical practice of seasonal rites and celebrations for farming areas; they were considered to be of low status by the middle class, however, and were affiliated with the Sanjō districts in which "the discriminated classes" lived. However, folk beliefs in the visits of  during such harvest festivals to rid villagers of impurity upon receiving gifts from householders may have provided a socio-cultural basis for the willingness to offer food and money to itinerant performers; further,  was seen as an act of merit.

According to Hugh de Ferranti, iconographic and literary sources generally portray  as solitary and pitiable figures, though wealthy and powerful individuals also exist in such representations. Sometimes they are depicted as mysterious, frightening, and potentially dangerous individuals while in other sources, they are "ridiculous" characters "to be made fun of, at times with unbridled cruelty". Folklore links  to ghosts through their placation of wronged spirits and the chinkon ritual performance, accounts for their fearful quality. However,  plays called  feature deliberate tricking of a blind  so that he becomes lost and disoriented, or suffers losses and misunderstanding. Such action is provoked by sighted individuals for pure amusement, as in the stories of Saru  and Tsukimi . In these images, people "look out from their houses at the  players and appear to be laughing or jeering at them", while children run away from and dogs bark at them.

Development of the  style
The present trend of scholarly analysis is to consider the 's origin as having arisen first as a  recitation for the purpose of spreading Buddhism. He was invited to an imperial discourse on poems, and unable to recall two of the seven virtues, was thus named the Jack of Five Virtues. Embarrassed, he gave up on learning poetry and took the tonsure, and became a monk under the abbot Jien of the Tendai sect. Jien was known to gather talent at the Shōren-in temple on Mount Hiei in Kyoto to discuss ways of spreading the Tendai faith.

According to George Gish, there were five essential ingredients for the development of the :

 Chinese popular sermons designed to appeal to the masses, known as 
  style of Buddhist preaching with melody, a style favored by Jien
  influence from the Kyoto- school from which idea of accompanying narration with  derives
 The  story itself chronicling the Taira/Genji Heian period, oft interpreted as one phase of Buddhism's six worlds.

Author Yukinaga brought elements of the court tradition, while Jien offered shomyo aspects. Shōbutsu as a Kyoto- and a  brought unique perspectives as well.

From Shobutsu, two schools emerged, the Yasaka-ryū school, led by Jōgen, and Ichikata-ryū school, headed by Jōichi. Akashi Kakuichi was Jōichi's disciple and a favorite of  Ashikaga Takauji, possibly due to blood relations.

Musically, development continued with the Ichikata-ryū, with it spreading into four separate branches. During the Edo period, the main branches split further with the influence of the  style. The main schools were Hatano-ryū and Maeda-ryū, named after their respective founders; intense rivalry between the schools, compounded by changes in the music world at large, contributed to the decline of the  tradition.

Some of the earliest innovations were carried out by  players. The opportunities with the  attracted others, and their patrons and listeners along with them.

See also
 Blind musicians

References

Bibliography
De Ferranti, Hugh. The Last Biwa Singer: a Blind Musician in History, Imagination, and Performance. Ithaca, NY: Cornell UP, 2009.
Frederic, Louis. Japan Encyclopedia. Belknap, Harvard University Press, 2008.
Gish, George W. The Biwa in History, Its Origins and Development in Japan. Ann Arbor: University of Michigan, 1967.
Groemer, Gerald. The Spirit of Tsugaru: Blind Musicians, Tsugaru-jamisen, and the Folk Music of Northern Japan, with the Autobiography of Takahashi Chikuzan. Sterling Heights: Harmonie Park Press, 1999.
History of Japanese Traditional Music. Japanese Traditional Music. Columbia Music Entertainment, 2002. Retrieved 2011-04-04.
The Asiatic Society of Japan. Transactions of the Asiatic Society of Japan. University of Oregon Libraries. University of Oregon, 1918. Retrieved 2011-04-04.
Tokita, Alison, and David W. Hughes. The Ashgate Research Companion to Japanese Music. Aldershot, Hampshire, England: Ashgate, 2008.

Japanese blind people
Buddhism in Japan
Japanese folk music
Japanese folk religion